The Aruba national baseball team is the national baseball team of Aruba.

References

See also 
 Baseball in the Netherlands

National baseball teams
Baseball
Baseball in the Caribbean